Dolphin Footbal Club was a Nigerian football team based in Port Harcourt.

History
The club was known until 2001 as Eagle Cement FC.

In 2004–05 the team placed 6th in the Nigerian Premier League. Representing their country in the 2005 CAF Confederation Cup, they reached the finals, losing to Morocco's FAR Rabat. They play their home games at the Liberation Stadium. However, for the 2008 Confederation Cup they played their games at U. J. Esuene Stadium in Calabar.

They were relegated from the Nigerian Premier League in 2007 by one point. They however came back to retain the FA Cup over Enugu Rangers. In their run, they twice won by penalties 4–2, including a semi-final triumph over crosstown rivals Sharks before winning the final 3–2 on penalties. They returned to the Premier League after winning their division in 2009.

19 February 2016, the new merger of Dolphins F.C & Sharks F.C was announced and Rivers United F.C. was unveiled by the Honourable Commissioner of Sports, Rivers State – Hon. Boma Iyaye.

Achievements
Nigerian Premier League: 3
1997, 2004, 2011

Nigerian FA Cup: 4
2001, 2004, 2006, 2007

Professional Second Division: 3
1994, 2002, 2008–09

CAF Confederation Cup: 0
Finalist : 2005

Performance in CAF competitions
CAF Champions League: 3 appearances
1998 – Group stage
2005 – Second Round
2012 – First Round

CAF Confederation Cup: 3 appearances
2005 – Finalist
2007 – Group stage
2008 – Second Round

CAF Cup Winners' Cup: 1 appearance
2002 – First Round

Technical staff

Technical Manager
 Musa Abdulahi

Team Manager
 Diepreye Fiberesima

Club Secretary
 Fatai Olayinka

Accountant
 Fubara Ekine

Welfare Office
Wilson Igwe

Media Officer
 China Acheru

Curator
 Amanaman Udoh

Masseur
 Stamford Tiene

Former coaches
 Philip Boamah
 Ifeanyi J. Duruji

References

External links
2007 in Nigerian soccer (RSSSF)

 
Football clubs in Port Harcourt
1988 establishments in Nigeria
1980s establishments in Rivers State
Defunct football clubs in Nigeria
Sports clubs in Nigeria
2016 disestablishments in Nigeria
2010s disestablishments in Rivers State
Association football clubs established in 1988
Association football clubs disestablished in 2016